Thorgy Thor is the stage name of Shane Thor Galligan, an American drag queen and musician who came to international attention on the eighth season of RuPaul's Drag Race and on the third season of All Stars.

Early life 
Galligan studied music at the University of Hartford Hartt School in Connecticut before graduating from the State University of New York, Purchase with a Bachelor of Music in both viola and violin performance in 2006. He also knows how to play the cello.

His mother, Elaine Frantzen Galligan (born March 22, 1953), died from cancer on March 20, 2005.

Career

Drag 
Thorgy Thor moved to Brooklyn in 2006 and considers herself a Brooklyn queen. She has said Brooklyn's drag style has contributed to her aesthetic.

Galligan's first drag performance was as Frank N. Furter from The Rocky Horror Show. He was also Marvel Ann in the theater version of Psycho Beach Party. His original drag name was Shananigans; as Thorgy Thor she won the LEGEND award at the 2014 Brooklyn Nightlife Awards.

Having auditioned for Drag Race since season one, Galligan, as Thorgy Thor, was announced to be competing on the eighth season of RuPaul's Drag Race on February 1, 2016. She placed sixth out of twelve overall, losing to Chi Chi Devayne in the seventh episode. Thorgy was brought back for the third season of RuPaul's Drag Race: All Stars, revealed on October 20, 2017. Thorgy got eliminated in ninth place by season 2 and 3 queen Shangela. Thorgy's response to being eliminated, "Oh Jesus, gross", was turned into a three-second video clip and became a viral meme. During the show's finale, Thorgy Thor was the only queen to vote for Shangela, despite a previously rocky relationship.

Thorgy Thor appears with BeBe Zahara Benet, Jujubee and Alexis Michelle in the TLC special Drag Me Down the Aisle, which aired on March 9, 2019. The special was expanded into a full series titled Dragnificent! which premiered on April 19, 2020.

Music 
Thorgy Thor contributed to the albums Christmas Queens 2 (2016) and Christmas Queens 3 (2017). She was out of drag in the music video for Trinity The Tuck's "I Call Shade" in February 2019.

She has performed with string instruments at the Le Poisson Rouge, the Lincoln Center and the Carnegie Hall. In 2018, Thorgy Thor and conductor Daniel Bartholomew-Poyser created the symphony show "Thorgy and the Thorchestra", which was staged for the first time by Symphony Nova Scotia in Halifax, Nova Scotia, Canada in conjunction with Halifax Pride. The show blends orchestral performances of traditional and modern classical repertoire and contemporary pop songs. The show was subsequently performed with other orchestras in Canada and the United States, including the Vancouver Symphony Orchestra in Vancouver, British Columbia and the Charlotte Symphony Orchestra in Charlotte, North Carolina.

The creation and debut of Thorgy and the Thorchestra are profiled as part of Disruptor Conductor, Sharon Lewis's 2019 documentary film about Bartholomew-Poyser.

Filmography

Film/Television

Web series

Music videos

Discography

Singles

Featured singles

See also
 LGBT culture in New York City
 List of self-identified LGBTQ New Yorkers

References

External links

 
 

Living people
1984 births
21st-century violinists
American drag queens
American violinists
People from Brooklyn
RuPaul's Drag Race contestants
State University of New York at Purchase alumni
University of Hartford Hartt School alumni
Thorgy Thor